Melissa Martínez, (full name: Melissa Maria Margarita Martinez Romero; born on November 14, 1979 in Barranquilla), is a Colombian-born American actress and hostess.

Early life 
She was born in Barranquilla, Colombia, daughter of Nelly Romero Sosa journalist, actress and radio personality, and Guillermo Martinez Navarro journalist and radio personality as well. she began her interest in the artistic industry at 8 years old, when her mom took her to be part of the scene of the comedy TV show she was acting in barranquilla town, called " Que Sainete".  Since then Martínez participated in plays, dance shows, choir, and the school orquestra as a lead singer. She attended catholic school and graduated from Social Communications and journalism at Uniatonoma del Caribe University in her home town.
.

Career 
Martínez has made numerous television appearance as herself.
From 1998 through 2000 at the same time that Martínez was studying social communication she was working as a lead actress in the comedy show called Cual es la Vaina (What is the Matter) in Barranquilla, Colombia.

2007, she worked as a co-host and model for the Telemundo show Buena Fortuna on Telemundo. In the same year she was named Miss Congeniality at the Long Beach Grand Prix in Long Beach, California.

2008, Martínez had a supporting role in the film The Crown Underneath Her Feet.

2009, she starred in the film Life vs Death. In the same year, she shot a comedy pilot for NBC called The Good Life and was the weather girl on Canal 22 (Channel 22), a Spanish TV station in Los Angeles.

2011, appeared as the lead actress and model in the Mexican singer Cristian Castro's music video "Lo Dudo".

2012, Martínez hosted a mystical and Entertainment national show on LATV.

Currently, Martínez is doing what she loves the most,  Comedy in the  national TV show El Pelado de la Noche on Azteca America

Filmography

References

External links
 Melissa Martinez is a weather girl on Canal 22
 Melissa Martinez actress and model for music video Lo Dudo
 Melissa Martinez hosted Astroloko on LATV
 El Pelado de la Noche on Azteca America

21st-century American actresses
American female models
Hispanic and Latino American actresses
Living people
People from Barranquilla
1979 births
Colombian emigrants to the United States
American film actresses